The JŽ Series 310 was a 3000V DC electric multiple unit once operated by the  Yugoslav State Railways (JŽ).

Only one unit of the class existed, consisting of three cars, numbered 310.001, 314.001 and 314.002. The unit was an ex FS class ALe 883 (it:FS ALe 883).

See also
SŽ series 310, Slovenian railways has operated a class 310 unit - these are post breakup vehicles, of Pendolino type.

References

External links 
 http://www.railfaneurope.net/ric/electric_locomotives.htm

Multiple units of Croatia
Multiple units of Yugoslavia
3000 V DC multiple units